Ḥarbī al-Ḥimyarī is a semi-legendary Himyarite sage that occurs several times in the writings attributed to the Islamic alchemist Jābir ibn Ḥayyān (died c. 806−816). He is said there to have been one of Jabir's teachers, and to have been 463 years old when Jabir met him. One of Jabir's lost works was dedicated to Harbi al-Himyari's contributions to alchemy, a fact which may point to the existence in Jabir's time of a written work attributed to him.

References

Sources 
 
 

Alchemy
Legendary people
Himyarites